Golam Md Hasibul Alam is a Bangladeshi Civil Servant and senior Secretary of the Ministry of Defence.

Early life 
Alam was born in 1964 in Nilphamari District, East Pakistan, Pakistan. He is married to Sharmin Amin Choudhury. He completed his Masters in English Literature from the University of Dhaka.

Career 
Alam joined the Bangladesh Civil Service as an administration cadre in 1989 and started as a land commissioner. He held a number of field level administration posts including Land Acquisition Officer and Upazila Nirbahi Officer. He served as Senior Assistant Secretary at the Economic Relations Division. He is a former Deputy Commissioner (DC) of Patuakhali District in 2011 where he oversaw removal of illegal structures from Kuakata Beach.

On 18 December 2013, Alam was transferred from Officer on Special Duty to the Economic Relations Division as Joint Secretary.

Alam joined the Ministry of Primary and Mass Education as an additional secretary. He worked at International Fund for Agricultural Development as its country resource officer on deputation from the Government of Bangladesh. On 25 October 2020, Alam was appointed Secretary of the Ministry of Primary and Mass Education. He had been serving as the Chairman of the National Skills Development Authority. On 10 February 2021, Alam announced plans to vaccinate all primary school teachers in Bangladesh within one week. In September 2021, numerous media reports alleged officers of the Ministry were transferring because of Alam's behavior problems. The minister, Md Zakir Hossain, defended Alam in a joint press conference with him.

On 13 February 2022, Alam was appointed Secretary of the Ministry of Defence. He was the chief guest at the World Meteorological Day-2022 summit in Dhaka.

References 

1964 births
Living people
Bangladeshi civil servants
University of Dhaka alumni